The NRS-2 (Нож Разведчика Стреляющий, "Scout Firing Knife") (official GRAU index 6P25U) is a gun hybrid with a combination of a knife blade and a built-in single-shot shooting mechanism designed to fire a 7.62×41mm SP-4 (СП-4) cartridge, originally designed for the PSS silent pistol.

It was manufactured by the Tula Arms Plant for Soviet Spetsnaz troops in the 1980s, and is still used as a personal weapon for modern Spetsnaz troops and special law enforcement groups. The NRS-2 is designed for either stabbing or throwing with the blade, or fired at distances of up to 25 metres.

Shooting mechanism
To load the shooting mechanism, the opening lever is pressed, and the barrel rotated out of the knife handle, then the cartridge is reinserted into the firing chamber and the barrel is inserted back into the handle and rotated back into place using two prongs that fit into the outer latch. The flip-up lever on the right side of the NRS-2 is pulled to cock the internal hammer, and before firing the safety catch located beside the barrel must be turned to the "fire" position. Then the user's left hand is used to hold the underside of the grip, and the right hand held against the right side, with the right index finger being placed on the single action push-button trigger, which is located above the safety catch beside the gun barrel.

NR-2 survival knife
A modified version of the NRS-2, the NR-2, with the shooting mechanism replaced by a container of survival equipment, was also developed.

See also
List of Russian weaponry
NR-40
PSS Silent Pistol
TKB-506

References

External links

NR-2/NRS-2 
Scout knife Special NRS-2 

Special forces of Russia
Military knives of the Soviet Union
Tula Arms Plant products
TsNIITochMash products
Military equipment introduced in the 1980s